William Bury may refer to:

William Bury (MP New Shoreham) (fl. 1449), for New Shoreham (UK Parliament  constituency)
William Bury (Roundhead) (c. 1605–1669), fought for Parliament during the English Civil War. A Member of the First Protectorate Parliament
William Bury (cricketer) (1839–1927), English cricketer, clergyman and Poor Law reformer
William Henry Bury (1859–1889), Jack the Ripper suspect
William Bury (footballer) (born 1865) was an English professional footballer who played as a full back for Burnley

See also

William Berry (disambiguation)